Clearbrook Halt was a railway station on the South Devon and Tavistock Railway serving the villages of Clearbrook and Meavy in South Devon, nine miles to the North of Plymouth, and a mile and a half from Yelverton.

Station 
The station consisted of a short platform and sported a GWR pagoda-type waiting room and ticket office.

It was staffed by a part-time attendant, and closed in 1962.

History 
The Plym Valley railway ran from Plymouth North Road station to Marsh Mills. From there it followed the course of the River Plym, along the edges of Dartmoor, until it reached Tavistock, an ancient Stannary town.

In the 1950s, the line was fairly busy with both passenger and freight trains. Freight included cattle, milk, and general goods. One pick-up freight train per day, usually with a 52xx Class 2-6-2 Prairie tank locomotive in charge.

Passenger trains usually consisted of one or two coaches, often using older "Hawksworth" stock, and pulled by either a 0-6-0 ex GWR Pannier tank, or another 2-6-2 Prairie.

The Branch passenger service was withdrawn from 31 December 1962, the last train running in a heavy blizzard and the Marsh Mills to Tavistock was then closed completely. It was demolished in the summer/autumn of 1964, and within two years the northern freight only sections were abandoned.

References 

Disused railway stations in Devon
Former Great Western Railway stations
Railway stations in Great Britain opened in 1928
Railway stations in Great Britain closed in 1962